Anthony Gillet (born 7 February 1976 in Rennes, Ille-et-Vilaine) is a retired male racewalker from France. He competed for his native country in the men's 20 km race walk event at the 2000 Summer Olympics.

Achievements

References
 
 sports-reference

1976 births
Living people
French male racewalkers
Athletes (track and field) at the 2000 Summer Olympics
Olympic athletes of France
Sportspeople from Rennes
20th-century French people